Woodside School is a co-educational boarding school and day school situated on the outskirts of Udhagamandalam Tamil Nadu, India, a hill station which is more commonly known under its abbreviated name of Ooty. The campus of the school rises steeply from National Highway 67. The school roll includes children from local areas and many states of India. The school also has a small number of pupils from European and Northern Asian backgrounds.

History
The  campus was originally part of the Ooty Club where, it is claimed, the game of snooker was first played by officers of the British Raj. The original school was established for primary and junior standards only and has since increased its size to cover primary, intermediate and higher education. A non-profit trust was established by the present Correspondent, Mr K Balalingiah, to oversee the financial background of the school. The deeds of the trust provide that any excess of income over expenditure should be put to the betterment of the school, its pupils and surroundings. The trust also provides for two 100% educational scholarships annually for students coming from a financially disadvantaged background. Woodside School follows the Central Board of Secondary Education (CBSE) syllabus up to Standard 12 . The school motto is 'Sapere Aude' (Dare to be wise), a quote from the writings of the Greek philosopher Horace.

Aims and Objectives
The aim of Woodside School is to provide education to boarding and day scholar children emanating principally from middle income backgrounds. The value of spoken and written English as a method of communication is highly stressed. Social awareness and discipline is an important aspect of the school. The school's aim is to develop a secular attitude in its students and generate good members of society and socially aware citizens of India.

References

External links
 School website

Primary schools in Tamil Nadu
High schools and secondary schools in Tamil Nadu
Schools in Nilgiris district
Education in Ooty
Educational institutions established in 1991
1991 establishments in Tamil Nadu